Ferdinando Mastroianni (born 21 March 1992) is an Italian footballer who plays as a forward for  club Fiorenzuola.

Club career
He made his Serie C debut for AlbinoLeffe on 3 September 2016 in a game against Padova.

On 20 July 2020, he joined Lecco.

On 10 January 2022, he moved to Fiorenzuola.

References

External links
 

1992 births
Living people
Sportspeople from the Province of Caserta
Footballers from Campania
Italian footballers
Association football forwards
Serie C players
Serie D players
S.S.C. Bari players
A.C. Montichiari players
U.S. Vibonese Calcio players
U.S. Gavorrano players
A.C. Bellaria Igea Marina players
Clodiense S.S.D. players
A.C. Este players
A.C. Carpi players
U.C. AlbinoLeffe players
A.S. Pro Piacenza 1919 players
Aurora Pro Patria 1919 players
Calcio Lecco 1912 players
U.S. Fiorenzuola 1922 S.S. players